Joe Louis vs. Max Schmeling (or Max Schmeling vs. Joe Louis) refers to two separate fights between the men which are among boxing's most talked-about bouts. Schmeling took the first match in 1936 by a knockout in round 12 but Louis won the second bout in 1938 with a knockout in the first round. The two fights came to embody the broader political and social conflict of the time. As the most significant African American athlete of his age and the most successful black fighter since Jack Johnson, Louis was a focal point for African American pride in the 1930s. Moreover, as a contest between representatives of the United States and Nazi Germany during the 1930s, the fights came to symbolize the struggle between democracy and fascism.

Prelude to first fight
Joe Louis was born in Alabama, but lived much of his early years in Detroit. As a successful African American professional in the northern part of the country, Louis was seen by many other Americans as a symbol of the liberated black man. Since becoming a professional heavyweight, Louis amassed a record of 24–0 and was considered invincible heading into his first bout with Schmeling in 1936. Louis' celebrity was particularly important for African Americans of the era, who were not only suffering economically along with the rest of the country but also were the targets of significant racially motivated violence, particularly in Southern states by members of the Ku Klux Klan. By the time of the Louis-Schmeling match, Schmeling was thought of as the final stepping stone to Louis' eventual title bid.

Max Schmeling, on the other hand, was born in Germany, and he had become the first world heavyweight champion to win the title by disqualification in 1930, against Jack Sharkey, another American. One year later, Schmeling retained his title by a Round 15 knockout against William Stribling.  Later Schmeling lost the title in a rematch with Sharkey by a very controversial decision in 1932. As a result, Schmeling was well known to American boxing fans and was still considered the No. 2 contender for James Braddock's heavyweight title in 1936. Nevertheless, many boxing fans considered Schmeling, 30 years old by the time of his first match with Louis, to be on the decline and not a serious challenge for the Brown Bomber.

Perhaps, as a result, Louis took training for the Schmeling fight none too seriously. Louis' training retreat was at Lakewood, New Jersey, where Louis was introduced to the game of golf – later to become a lifelong passion. Louis spent significant time on the golf course rather than training.
Conversely, Schmeling prepared intently for the bout. Schmeling had thoroughly studied Louis's style, and believed he had found a weakness: Louis's habit of dropping his left hand low after a jab.

Although the political aspect of the first Louis-Schmeling bout would later be dwarfed by the crucible of the later 1938 rematch, brewing political sentiment would inevitably attach itself to the fight. Adolf Hitler had become chancellor of Germany three years previously and, although the United States and Germany were not yet political or military enemies, there was some tension building among the two countries as the Nazi Party began asserting its pro-Aryan, anti-Jewish ideology. Schmeling's Jewish manager, Joe Jacobs, set up Schmeling's training at a Jewish resort in the Catskills, hoping it would help mollify Jewish fight fans.

First fight

The first fight between Louis and Schmeling took place on June 19, 1936, at the famous Yankee Stadium in Bronx, New York. The referee was the legendary Arthur Donovan, and the stadium's seats were sold out. The bout was scheduled for fifteen rounds. 57 million people listened on their radios.

Schmeling's study of Louis' style led him to openly say, in days before the fight, that he had found the key to victory; fans thought that he was just trying to raise interest in the fight. Nevertheless, boxing fans still wanted to see the rising star against the famed former world champion.

Schmeling spent the first three rounds using his jab while sneaking his right cross behind his jab. Louis was stunned by his rival's style. In the fourth round, a snapping right landed on Louis' chin, and Louis was sent to the canvas for the first time in his twenty-eight professional fights. As the fight progressed, stunned fans and critics alike watched Schmeling continue to use this style effectively, and Louis had no idea how to solve the puzzle.

As rounds went by, Louis suffered various injuries, including one to the eye. Louis remained busy, trying to land a punch that would give him a knockout victory, but, with eyesight trouble and Schmeling's jab constantly in his face, this proved impossible.

By round twelve, Schmeling was far ahead on the judges' scorecards. Finally, he landed a right to Louis' body, followed by another right hand, this one to the jaw. Louis fell near his corner and was counted out by Donovan. This was Louis' only knockout defeat during his first run: the only other knockout happened when Rocky Marciano knocked Louis out fifteen years later. By then, Louis was considered a faded champion and Marciano a rising star.

Among the attendees at Louis' defeat was Langston Hughes, a major figure in the Harlem Renaissance and noted literary figure. Hughes described the national reaction to Louis' defeat in these terms:

I walked down Seventh Avenue and saw grown men weeping like children, and women sitting in the curbs with their heads in their hands. All across the country that night when the news came that Joe was knocked out, people cried.

Conversely, the German reaction to the outcome was jubilant.  Hitler contacted Schmeling's wife, sending her flowers and a message: "For the wonderful victory of your husband, our greatest German boxer, I must congratulate you with all my heart." Schmeling dutifully reciprocated with nationalistic comments for the German press, telling a German reporter after the fight:

At this moment I have to tell Germany, I have to report to the Fuehrer in particular, that the thoughts of all my countrymen were with me in this fight; that the Fuehrer and his faithful people were thinking of me. This thought gave me the strength to succeed in this fight. It gave me the courage and the endurance to win this victory for Germany's colors.

Prelude to second fight

After his victory over Louis, Schmeling negotiated for a title bout with world heavyweight champion James J. Braddock. But the talks fell through – partially because of the more lucrative potential of a Louis-Braddock matchup, and partially because of the possibility that, in the event of a Schmeling victory, Nazi authorities would not allow subsequent title challenges by American opponents. Instead, Louis fought Braddock on June 22, 1937, knocking him out in eight rounds in Chicago. Louis, however, publicly announced after the fight that he refused to recognize himself as world champion until he fought Schmeling again.

The United States economy had long been suffering from the Great Depression when these two combatants had their two fights. The economic problem affected the United States throughout the 1930s, and many Americans sought inspiration in the world of sports.

Compounding the economic instability was a heated political conflict between Nazi Germany and the United States.  By the time of the Louis–Schmeling rematch in 1938, Nazi Germany had taken over Austria in the Anschluss, heightening tensions between Germany and the other Western powers, and generating much anti-German propaganda in the American media. The German regime generated an onslaught of racially charged propaganda of its own; much of it created by propaganda minister Joseph Goebbels based on Schmeling's success in the boxing world.

Schmeling did not relish being the focus of such propaganda. He was not a member of the Nazi Party and – although proud of his German nationality – denied the Nazi claims of racial superiority: "I am a fighter, not a politician.  I am no superman in any way." Schmeling kept his Jewish manager, Joe Jacobs, despite significant pressure, and, in a dangerous political gamble, refused the "Dagger of Honor" award offered by Adolf Hitler. In fact, Schmeling had been urged by his friend and legendary ex-champion Jack Dempsey to defect and declare American citizenship. Schmeling never did revoke his German citizenship, however. Schmeling was quoted saying, "Once a German, always a German."

Nevertheless, the Nazi regime exploited Schmeling in its propaganda efforts and took careful steps to at least ensure Schmeling's nominal compliance. Schmeling's wife and mother were kept from traveling with him to avert any attempt he might make to defect.

Schmeling's entourage also included an official Nazi Party publicist. The publicist not only controlled any possible contrarian remarks by Schmeling, but also issued statements that a black man could not defeat Schmeling, and that Schmeling's purse from the fight would be used to build more German tanks. Hitler himself lifted the nationwide 3:00 a.m. curfew so that cafés and bars could carry the broadcast for their patrons. As a result, the perception of the American public had turned decidedly against Schmeling between 1936 and 1938. Schmeling was picketed at his hotel room, received a tremendous amount of hate mail, and was assaulted with cigarette butts and other detritus as he approached the ring.

A few weeks before the rematch, Louis visited President Franklin Delano Roosevelt at the White House. The New York Times quoted Roosevelt as telling the fighter, "Joe, we need muscles like yours to beat Germany." In his 1976 biography, Louis wrote, "I knew I had to get Schmeling good. I had my own personal reasons and the whole damned country was depending on me." This time, Louis took training for the bout seriously, giving up golf and women throughout his training. Joe Louis said to a friend before the fight, "Yeah, I'm scared. I'm scared I might kill Schmeling."

A few days before the fight, the New York State Athletic Commission had ruled that Joe Jacobs, Schmeling's manager, was ineligible to work in the German's corner, or be in the locker room, as punishment for a previous public relations infraction involving fighter "Two-Ton" Tony Galento. In addition, Schmeling's normal cornerman, Doc Casey, declined to work with Schmeling, fearing bad publicity. As a result, Schmeling sat anxiously in the locker room before the bout; in contrast, Louis took a two-hour nap.

Second fight

The Louis-Schmeling rematch came on June 22, 1938 – one year from the day Louis had won the world Heavyweight title. The fighters met once again in a sold-out Yankee Stadium in New York City. Among the more than 70,000 fans in attendance were Clark Gable, Douglas Fairbanks, Gary Cooper, Gregory Peck, and J. Edgar Hoover. The fight drew gate receipts of $1,015,012 (equivalent to $ million in ). 70 million listened on radio in the U.S., and over 100 million around the world.

Schmeling came out of his corner trying to utilize the same style that got him the victory in their first fight, with a straight-standing posture and his left hand prepared to begin jabbing.

Louis' strategy, however, had been to get the fight over early. Before the fight, he mentioned to his trainer Jack "Chappie" Blackburn that he would devote all his energy to the first three rounds, and even told sportswriter Jimmy Cannon that he predicted a knockout in one.  After only a few seconds of feinting, Louis unleashed a tireless barrage on Schmeling. Referee Arthur Donovan stopped action for the first time just over one minute and a half into the fight after Louis connected on five left hooks and a body blow to Schmeling's lower left which had him audibly crying in pain. After sending Louis briefly to his corner, Donovan quickly resumed action, after which Louis went on the attack again, immediately felling the German with a right hook to the face. Schmeling went down this time, arising on the count of three.

Louis then resumed his barrage, this time focusing on Schmeling's head.  After connecting on three clean shots to Schmeling's jaw, the German fell to the canvas again, arising at the count of two. With Schmeling having few defenses left at this point, Louis connected at will, sending Schmeling to the canvas for the third time in short order, this time near the ring's center. Schmeling's cornerman Max Machon threw a towel in the ring – although, under New York state rules, this did not end the fight. Machon was therefore forced to enter the ring at the count of eight, at which point Donovan had already declared the fight over. Louis was the winner and world Heavyweight champion, by a technical knockout, two minutes and four seconds into the first round. In all, Louis had thrown 41 punches in the fight, 31 of which landed solidly. Schmeling, by contrast, had been able to throw only two punches. Soundly defeated, Schmeling had to be admitted to Polyclinic Hospital for ten days. During his stay, it was discovered that Louis had cracked several vertebrae in Schmeling's back.

Schmeling and his handlers complained after the bout that Louis' initial volley had included an illegal kidney punch, and even refused Louis' visitation at the hospital. The claim resounded hollowly in the media, however, and they eventually chose not to file a formal complaint.

Aftermath
The fight had racial as well as political undertones. Much of black America pinned its hopes on the outcome of this Joe Louis fight and his other matches, seeing Louis' success as a vehicle for advancing the cause of African Americans everywhere. Poet and author Maya Angelou, among others, recounted her recollection of the first Louis-Schmeling fight. She had listened to the fight over the radio in her uncle's country store in rural Arkansas.  While Louis was on the ropes,

My race groaned.  It was our people falling.  It was another lynching, yet another black man hanging on a tree . ... this might be the end of the world.  If Joe lost we were back in slavery and beyond help.  It would all be true, the accusations that we were lower types of human beings.  Only a little higher than the apes ...

Conversely, when Louis won the rematch fight, emotions were unbounded:

Champion of the world. A Black boy. Some Black mother's son. He was the strongest man in the world. People drank Coca-Cola like ambrosia and ate candy bars like Christmas.

In his autobiography, Schmeling himself confirmed the public's reaction to the outcome, recounting his ambulance ride to the hospital afterward: "As we drove through Harlem, there were noisy, dancing crowds. Bands had left the nightclubs and bars and were playing and dancing on the sidewalks and streets. The whole area was filled with celebration, noise, and saxophones, continuously punctuated by the calling of Joe Louis' name."

Reaction in the mainstream American press, while positive toward Louis, reflected the implicit racism in the United States at the time. Lewis F. Atchison of The Washington Post began his story: "Joe Louis, the lethargic, chicken-eating young colored boy, reverted to his dreaded role of the 'brown bomber' tonight"; Henry McLemore of the United Press called Louis "a jungle man, completely primitive as any savage, out to destroy the thing he hates."

The day after the fight, blues musician Bill Gaither recorded one of his most famous songs, "Champ Joe Louis," a song praising the champ in his defeat of Max Schmeling. 

Although Schmeling rebounded professionally from the loss to Louis (winning the European Heavyweight Title in 1939 by knocking out Adolf Heuser in the 1st round), the Nazi regime would cease promoting him as a national hero. Schmeling and Nazi authorities grew further in opposition over time. During the Kristallnacht of November 1938, Schmeling provided sanctuary for two young Jewish boys to safeguard them from the Gestapo. Conversely, as a way of punishing Schmeling for his increasingly public resistance, Hitler drafted Schmeling into paratrooper duty in the German Luftwaffe. After brief military service and a comeback attempt in 1947–48, Schmeling retired from professional boxing. He would go on to invest his earnings in various post-War businesses. His resistance to the Nazi party elevated his status once again to that of a hero in post-war Germany.

Louis went on to become a major celebrity in the United States and is considered the first true African American national hero. When other prominent blacks questioned whether African Americans should serve against the Axis nations in the segregated U.S. Armed Forces, Louis disagreed, saying, "There are a lot of things wrong with America, but Hitler ain't gonna fix them." He would go on and serve the United States Army during World War II, but he did not engage in battle while the war was going on. He mostly visited soldiers in Europe to provide them with motivational speeches and with boxing exhibitions. He kept defending the world heavyweight title until 1949, making twenty-five consecutive title defenses – still, a world record among all weight divisions for men's boxing (Regina Halmich, a woman boxer, made 29 defenses of her Women's International Boxing Federation world Flyweight championship).

Louis' finances evaporated later in life, and he became involved in the use of illicit drugs.

Louis and Schmeling developed a friendship outside the ring, which endured until Louis' death on April 12, 1981. Their rivalry and friendship was the focus of the 1978 TV movie Ring of Passion. Louis got a job as a greeter at the Caesars Palace hotel in Las Vegas, and Schmeling flew to visit him every year. Louis was reportedly so in need of money, but too damaged to box anymore, so the former champion took up professional wrestling to make ends meet. Schmeling reportedly also sent Louis money in Louis' later years and covered a part of the costs of Louis' funeral, at which he was a pallbearer. Schmeling died 24 years later on February 2, 2005 at the age of 99. He was ranked 55 on The Ring'''s list of 100 greatest punchers of all time in 2003.

Both Louis and Schmeling are members of the International Boxing Hall of Fame.

Louis–Schmeling paradox
The rivalry between Louis and Schmeling gave rise to the Louis–Schmeling paradox, a concept in sports economics. It was first identified and named by Walter C. Neale, in his article "The peculiar economics of professional sports", published in the Quarterly Journal of Economics in February 1964. The paradox, as identified by Neale, is that the general rule that monopoly is the "ideal market position of a firm" does not hold for professional sports. Where non-sporting firms are "better off the smaller or less important the competition", sporting firms require competitors to be successful: if Joe Louis had had no competitors, he "would have had no one to fight and therefore no income". Neale resolved the paradox by drawing a distinction between sporting competition and market competition, holding that "the firm in law, as organized in the sporting world, is not the firm of economic analysis".

The paradox is sometimes re-stated as "commercial sporting organizations need close competition if they are to be able to maximize their income", as a result of Neale's further conclusion that "demand for competition will decrease if the spectators can predict the outcome of the game". However, this has been challenged by Roger G. Noll, who noted in the Oxford Review of Economic Policy in 2003 that "a team that has dropped out of contentions for a championship will generally draw poorly, but it is likely to sell more tickets if it is playing a team that is at or near that top of the standings than if it is playing another weak team, even though the outcome of the latter game is more uncertain".

See alsoJoe and Max'' (2002 film)

Notes

References

External links
Video of 1936 Louis-Schmeling Bout
Video of 1938 Louis-Schmeling Rematch

Schmeling
1936 in boxing
1938 in boxing
Boxing matches in New York City
Sports in the Bronx
1936 in sports in New York City
1938 in sports in New York City
1930s in the Bronx
June 1936 sports events
June 1938 sports events
United States National Recording Registry recordings